Cao Pengsheng (born July 1930) is a general in the People's Liberation Army of China who served as political commissar of the Lanzhou Military Region from 1990 to 1996.

He was a member of the Standing Committee of the 9th Chinese People's Political Consultative Conference. He was a representative of the 13th National Congress of the Chinese Communist Party. He was a member of the 14th Central Committee of the Chinese Communist Party.

Biography
Cao was born in Laoting County, Hebei, in July 1930. 

He enlisted in the People's Liberation Army (PLA) in 1948, and joined the Chinese Communist Party (CCP) in the following year. During the Chinese Civil War, he served in the war and engaged in the Liaoshen campaign and Pingjin campaign. 

In 1956, he enrolled at the PLA Second Political School, where he graduated in 1959. He was also a member of the Standing Committee of the CCP Shandong Provincial Committee, the province's top authority.

In February 1988, he was appointed deputy political commissar of the Jinan Military Region, he remained in that position until April 1990, when he was transferred to the Lanzhou Military Region and was promoted to become political commissar.

He was promoted to the rank of major general (shaojiang) in September 1988, lieutenant general (zhongjiang) in July 1990, and general (shangjiang) in May 1994.

References

1930 births
Living people
People from Laoting County
People's Liberation Army generals from Hebei
People's Republic of China politicians from Hebei
Chinese Communist Party politicians from Hebei
Members of the 14th Central Committee of the Chinese Communist Party
Members of the Standing Committee of the 9th Chinese People's Political Consultative Conference